Garden of Burning Apparitions is the eighth studio album (and fifth non-collaborative studio album) by the American grindcore band Full of Hell. The album was released on October 1, 2021 and is the band's second release through Relapse Records.

Track listing

Personnel 
Full of Hell
Spencer Hazard – guitar, electronics
Dylan Walker – vocals, electronics
David Bland – percussion
Sam DiGristine – bass, saxophone
Ryan Bloomer - electronics on "Derelict Satellite"
Shoshana Rosenberg – bass clarinet on "Murmuring Foul Spring"

Production and artwork
 Seth Manchester – production
 Adam Gonsalves – mastering
 Mark McCoy – artwork and design

References 

2021 albums
Full of Hell (band) albums
Relapse Records albums